The Prior of Rochester was the head of the Benedictine Priory of St. Andrew established at Rochester Cathedral in 1083.  The priory was dissolved in 1540 and the last prior, Walter Phillips (or Phylypp) became the first Dean of the Cathedral Church of Christ and the Blessed Virgin Mary.

References

Rochester